The O class was a planned class of three battlecruisers for the Kriegsmarine (German navy) before  World War II.

The ships were incorporated into the 1939 Plan Z for the re-equipment and expansion of the Kriegsmarine; while an aircraft carrier, H-class battleships and smaller ships engaged convoy escorts, one or more O-class ships would attack the merchant ships.

The O class' design reflected their intended role; a heavy main armament (six 380 mm guns in three dual turrets) for possible encounters with escorting -armed heavy cruisers, enough armor to defend against the same and nothing more, and a high top speed so that they could get away from slower but much better armored capital ships.

Although planned and ordered, construction did not progress due to lack of materials and higher priorities for ship construction.

Development

Genesis: P-class cruisers 

Even with the completion of the two s and the construction of two s, the German Navy had fewer ships than other European navies. This led to a decision in 1937 to build ships to an improved  design. After more than twenty designs were considered to meet the navy's specifications, one was chosen; it was designated as cruiser "P" (the "P" for panzer — German: "armor"). Under the original plan, twelve P-class ships were to be built. The ships were designed as cruiser killers that would have heavy enough armament and armor to take on light and heavy cruisers but enough speed to outrun battleships and battlecruisers.

Many problems were encountered with designing the ships, the most prevalent being armor. The required maximum speed of  meant that the minimum length had to grow from the original . Unfortunately for the designers, the widened beam meant that an even longer hull was needed to maintain hydrodynamic efficiency. All of this complicated the armor arrangements, as more armor was needed to cover the longer length and widened beam. Eventually it was deemed that it was impossible to include diesel power on a  displacement.

The switch to battlecruisers was the result of a proposal to up the main armament from /55 caliber guns to /47 caliber guns. Various reasons were behind this. Among other reasons, experiments showed that the smaller gun was "far less effective" than the larger gun, a class of twelve ships would have overtaxed the shipyards already heavily burdened with other ships, and the smallest guns on any foreign capital ship in service or under construction were more than  larger in caliber than the 283 mm guns. The most persuasive argument for increasing the armament came in 1939, when Adolf Hitler denounced the 1935 Anglo-German Naval Agreement.

Battlecruisers 

Although interest in the P-class ships and the battlecruiser proposal waned for a time in late 1937 and early 1938, it was quickly revived on 28 April 1938 with Hitler's public airing of his views on the 1935 Anglo-German Treaty and the consequent increased possibility of war with the United Kingdom. Calling the Naval Staff and Admiral Erich Raeder to him, Hitler laid out his thoughts of a strong navy that could pose enough danger to the British such that they would enter into an alliance with Germany rather than go to war. As decided here, Plan Z entailed two task forces each centered on three H-class battleships and one aircraft carrier, with cruisers and destroyers as escorts. In war, these forces would collaborate with the three battlecruisers by occupying convoy screens while U-boats and one or more of the O class took out the cargo-carrying merchant ships. The presence of the battlecruisers operating at large would have the secondary effect of forcing the Royal Navy to deploy battleships as convoy escorts, thus weakening any fleet that could engage the Plan Z task forces.

As part of the plan, design work on the P class was halted in mid-1939 in favor of the O class.

Like the P class, there were problems with fitting an all-diesel drive into the hull of the ships. It was enough that the design team decided that it would not be prudent to use an all-diesel arrangement; instead, a hybrid diesel-steam turbine propulsion plant was to be used.

Although plans were not finalized, the third battlecruiser, "Q", was ordered from Germaniawerft in Kiel on 8 August 1939. One month after, the contract design was refined. The main battery was the same as previously (six /47 caliber guns in dual turrets), while the secondary battery was split between six paired /48 caliber anti-surface guns and paired /65 caliber anti-aircraft guns because German designers had not been able to develop a satisfactory dual-purpose gun. Light anti-aircraft guns were eight 37 mm in four dual mounts and twenty 20 mm autocannon in single mounts. Twelve  torpedo tubes finished out the armament aboard the ships. Four floatplanes for scouting were planned.

By 1940, project drawings for the three battlecruisers were complete. They were reviewed by both Hitler and Raeder, both of whom approved. However, outside "initial procurement of materials and the issuance of some procurement orders", the ships' keels were never laid. In large part, this was due to severe material shortages, especially of high-grade steel, since there were more pressing needs for these materials for the war effort. In addition, the dockyard personnel necessary for the ships' construction were by now occupied with more pressing work, primarily on new U-boats.

Specifications

General characteristics 
The ships were to be of welded steel construction, with twenty watertight compartments and a double bottom that extended for 78% of the length of the hull. The ships were to have had a crew of 65 officers and 1,900 men.

They were intended to carry a number of boats aboard, including two picket boats, two barges, two launches, two pinnaces, two yawls, and two dinghies. The ships were also to be equipped with a double catapult mounted between the two funnels, and four Arado Ar 196 seaplanes for maritime reconnaissance. The aircraft were stored in a main hangar just aft of the forward funnel, along with two smaller hangars, one on each side of the rear funnel.

Propulsion 
The O-class ships were to be driven by three screws, two diesel powered and one steam. Eight MAN 24-cylinder V-configuration two-stroke diesel engines powered two Vulcan gearboxes, both of which drove the outer pair of  diameter three-bladed screws. Aft of the diesel engines was a single boiler room with four Wagner high-pressure boilers that provided up to 55 atmospheres of pressure. These supplied steam for one set of Brown, Boveri & Cie turbines, which provided power for the center  three-bladed screw. The O-class ships were designed to store 1,000 tons of fuel oil for the high pressure boilers, and up to 4,610 tons of diesel oil for the diesel engines. This enabled a maximum range of 14,000 nautical miles at a cruising speed of 19 knots. They were designed to steam at a maximum of 33.5 knots, but were capable of up to 35 knots. The ships had two rudders each. Eight 920 kW diesel generators supplied electrical power for the ships, for a total of 7360 kW, at 220 V.

Armament 

The ships' main armament batteries were to have consisted of six  L/47 SK C/34 quick-firing guns mounted in three twin turrets, the same Drh LC/38 gun turrets as were used on the Bismarck-class battleships. Two of the turrets were mounted in a superfiring pair forward, with the third turret placed aft of the main superstructure. The guns could depress to −8 degrees and elevate to 35 degrees. The guns had a designed supply of 630 shells, for a total of 105 rounds per gun. The guns used a  fore charge and a  main charge in a brass case. This provided a muzzle velocity of 820 meters per second (2,690 feet per second).

The secondary battery consisted of six  L/48 quick-firing guns, also mounted in three twin turrets; two were placed on either side of the forward superstructure, the third was placed aft of the main superstructure, superfiring over the rear main battery turret.

The ships had an anti-aircraft battery consisting of eight  L/65 SK C/33 heavy anti-aircraft guns, eight  L/83 SK C/30 anti-aircraft guns, and twenty . The 10.5 cm guns were emplaced in twin mounts, two on either side of the superstructure, as were the 3.7 cm guns. The 2 cm SK C/30 guns were placed in single mounts, dispersed on the superstructure amidships.

Armor 
The O-class ships were to be protected by Krupp Wotan steel armor. A second bulkhead was placed in the central portion of the ship. Critical areas were further protected by 80 mm-thick shields set back from the torpedo bulkhead. All of the lateral armor protection was Wotan Hart steel, with the exception of the torpedo bulkhead, which was Wotan Weich.

The ships had several layers of horizontal deck armor. The armored belt connected to 110 mm-thick sloping armor. The forward conning tower had a roof 60 mm thick and  armored sides; the aft conning tower was significantly less well protected. The rangefinders were protected against shell splinters by  roofs and 30 mm sides. All of this armor was Wotan Hart.

All of the anti-aircraft weaponry were also protected with 14 mm-thick gun shields. The aircraft hangars also had 14 mm-thick splinter protection. The relatively thin armor protection given to the ships of the O class led to their derisive nickname "Ohne Panzer Quatsch" (Without armor nonsense), a play on their provisional names.

Ships of the class

Footnotes

Notes

Citations

References

 
 
 
 
 

Plan Z
Battlecruisers of the Kriegsmarine
World War II battlecruisers of Germany
Proposed ships of Germany
Abandoned military projects of Germany